Tiilerilaaq (formerly Tiniteqilaaq) is a settlement in the Sermersooq municipality, in southeastern Greenland. Its population was 96 in 2020.

Population 
The population of Tiilerilaaq has decreased by 30 percent relative to the 1990 levels, and by 8 percent relative to the 2000 levels, reflecting the depopulation of the nearby Kuummiit and Isortoq.

Transport 
During weekdays Air Greenland serves the village by helicopter as part of government contract, with flights from Tiniteqilaaq Heliport and Kulusuk Airport.

References 

Populated places in Greenland